Hyvinkää Church, also known as The New Church of Hyvinkää, is a modernist church of the Evangelical Lutheran Church of Finland, located in the town of Hyvinkää, Finland. It was designed by architect Aarno Ruusuvuori and built in 1961.

Description
The pyramid-like Hyvinkää Church is probably the best-known building in Hyvinkää.
Wide windows produce the lighting, behind the altar is a large window. 

The organ was built in 1977 by Hans Heinrich and has 35 stops.

External links 

Lutheran churches in Finland
Church
20th-century Lutheran churches
Modernist architecture in Finland
Buildings and structures in Uusimaa
Tourist attractions in Uusimaa
Aarno Ruusuvuori buildings
Churches completed in 1961